Dregs of the Earth is the fourth studio album by Dixie Dregs, released in 1980. This album was the band's first release on Arista Records, their last one before changing its name to The Dregs, and contains a re-recording of one of their earlier songs ("The Great Spectacular"), which appeared on their 1976 demo The Great Spectacular.

Critical reception
At the time of release the writers of Billboard placed review on this album in section "Recommended LP's". As per them the musical style of the band is hard to categorize "but the musicianship is often superb".

The album received a Grammy nomination for Best Rock Instrumental Performance.

Track listing
All tracks are written by Steve Morse.

"Road Expense" – 3:24
"Pride o' the Farm" – 3:40
"Twiggs Approved" – 4:29
"Hereafter" – 6:21
"The Great Spectacular" – 3:20
"Broad Street Strut" – 3:54
"I'm Freaking Out" – 9:06
"Old World" – 2:00

Personnel
Dixie Dregs:
Steve Morse - acoustic and electric guitars, banjo, pedal steel
Andy West - fretted and fretless bass
Allen Sloan - acoustic and electric violins, viola
Rod Morgenstein - drums and percussion
T Lavitz - acoustic and electric piano, organ, synthesizer, clavinet

References

1980 albums
Dixie Dregs albums
Arista Records albums